Kaldor is a Jewish surname. Notable people with the surname include:

 Amber Kaldor (born 1990), Australian acrobatic gymnast
 Avraham Kaldor, Israeli winner of the Netanya chess tournament in 1976
 Connie Kaldor (born 1953), Canadian folk singer and songwriter
 John Kaldor (born 1936), Australian art collector and philanthropist
 John Kaldor, a character in the 1996 novel Awake and Dreaming by Kit Pearson 
 Lee Kaldor, Democratic legislator in the North Dakota State House
 Mary Kaldor (born 1946), British economics academic
 Nicholas Kaldor (1908–1986), British economist

See also
 Kaldor City, fictional city of the future in Doctor Who
 Andrew & Renata Kaldor Centre for International Refugee Law
 Kaldar (disambiguation)
 Calder (surname)
 Calder (disambiguation)